Manuae is an uninhabited atoll in the southern group of the Cook Islands, 100 kilometres south-east of Aitutaki. It is administratively part of Aitutaki, but it does not belong to any district or tapere of Aitutaki. It is, however, part of Arutanga-Reureu-Nikaupara Constituency.

Geographic description 

Manuae is a true atoll sitting on the peak of a submerged volcano which descends over 4000 meters to the ocean bed. It comprises two horseshoe-shaped islets, Manuae to the west and Te Au O Tu to the east, with a total area of 6 km2 on either side of a lagoon about 7 km x 4 km. Manuae has an area of 2.1 km2, while Te Au O Tu's is 3.9 km2. The lagoon is 13 km2 in size, shallow and subject to large shifting sand banks. A coral reef surrounds the atoll, and there is no passage through the reef.

The island is a marine park and is an important breeding ground for seabirds and marine turtles in the Central Pacific. The offshore waters of Manuae are good fishing grounds.

History 

According to oral tradition, Manuae was discovered by Ruatapu, who named it Manu-enua ("bird-land"). Ruatapu planted coconuts and released birds there, and later sent his second son and his family to settle the island. Another tradition states that the island was first settled by two brothers from Atiu, and that Ruatapu found it already inhabited. Later the island was attacked by Mangaia.

Captain James Cook sighted Manuae on his second voyage on 23 September 1773, but did not land. He visited again on 6 April 1777 during his third voyage, and found the island inhabited and apparently under the control of an ariki from Atiu. Cook initially named Manuae "Sandwich Island", but changed it to "Hervey Island" in honor of Augustus Hervey, 3rd Earl of Bristol, then a Lord of the Admiralty. This name was later corrupted to Hervey's Island, or Hervey's Isle, and later applied to the entire southern group, as the Hervey Islands.

In July 1823 the island was visited by John Williams of the London Missionary Society, who found it inhabited by sixty people. The island was depopulated shortly afterwards, and by 1852 was home to a single family. In 1888 it was declared to be a British protectorate. In 1900 it was annexed by New Zealand. At this stage the island was controlled by Aitutaki, who in 1898 leased it out as a copra plantation.

In April/May 1965 the population briefly increased to more than a hundred when the island was visited by six expeditions (from Australia, N.Z., Japan, U.K., U.S.A. and U.S.S.R.) to observe the total solar eclipse of 30 May 1965.

Norwegian author Erlend Loe writes humorously about an expedition to Manuae in his 1999 novel "L".

In April 2020 the Cook Islands National Environment Service advertised for two caretakers to live on the island for a year.

Economy and improvements 

The island once supported a small copra industry with a settlement established next to the small reef passage less than one kilometer northeast of Turakino, the westernmost point of the atoll.  The passage, at the sea entrance, is less than 4 metres wide and in a swell is exceedingly dangerous without local knowledge.

The island has an airfield (a dirt airstrip barely visible) that has been out of use for several years.
Fishermen from Aitutaki occasionally organise trips to Manuae. All regulations applicable to Aitutaki, apply to Manuae as well.

Demography 

The population peaked with 32 at the 1956 census, but twenty years later the island was abandoned.

See also 

 Desert island
 Lists of islands

References

External links 
 Manuae web page

Atolls of the Cook Islands
Uninhabited islands of the Cook Islands
Former populated places in Oceania